Stretchin' Out in Bootsy's Rubber Band is the first album by American funk and soul band Bootsy's Rubber Band, an offshoot act of Parliament-Funkadelic led by bassist and vocalist William "Bootsy" Collins. It was released on January 30, 1976, on Warner Bros. Records.

Recording and release

The album was recorded around the same time as Parliament's Mothership Connection and Funkadelic's Let's Take It To The Stage at United Sound Systems in Detroit, Michigan. The album was produced by Collins and George Clinton. Collins co-wrote all of the album's seven songs (two with Clinton, one with vocalist Leslyn Bailey and four with Clinton and other band members) and did the arrangements (horn arrangements in collaboration with Fred Wesley).

Since its original release, Stretchin' Out in Bootsy's Rubber Band has been reissued and remastered several times. In 2007, the album was licensed through Rhino Records and reissued through the Collectors Choice Music service.

Samples
"I'd Rather Be with You" has been sampled several times on notable tracks.
 by Childish Gambino on his song "Redbone" from his album "Awaken, My Love!" in 2016.
 by Beyoncé on her song "Be with You" from her 2003 debut album Dangerously in Love.
 by Adina Howard on her hit song "Freak Like Me" from her debut album Do You Wanna Ride? in 1995.
 by Eazy-E on his song "I'd Rather Fuck You" from the final N.W.A. album Niggaz4Life in 1991.
 by Tupac on his song "Ratha Be Ya Nigga" from the last album to be released during his lifetime, All Eyez on Me in 1996.
 by Questionmark Asylum on their song "Get with You/I'd Rather Be with You" from their album The Album in 1995.

Track listing

Personnel
Certain personnel are credited under nicknames on the album sleeve. The full names are given below.

Musicians
William Collins – bass, guitar, drums, vocals; cowbell on track 1
Phelps Collins – guitar
Garry Shider – guitar
Michael Hampton – guitar
Gary Cooper – drums, vocals; tambourine on track 1
Cordell Mosson – drums
Frank Waddy – drums
Fred Wesley – trombone
Maceo Parker – saxophone
Michael Brecker – saxophone
Rick Gardner – trumpet
Randy Brecker – trumpet
Bernie Worrell – keyboards; melodica on track 4
Sonny Talbert – keyboards
Frederick Allen – keyboards
Leslyn Bailey – vocals
Robert Johnson – vocals

Production
William Collins – production, arrangements, horn arrangements
George Clinton – production
Fred Wesley – horn arrangements
Jim Vitti – recording, engineering
Jim Callon – mixing
Allen Zentz – mastering
George Whiteman – photography (cover and liner photos)
Ed Thrasher – artwork (direction)
John Van Hamersveld – artwork (design)

Charts

Singles

References

External links
 Bootsy's Rubber Band-Stretchin' Out in Bootsy's Rubber Band at Discogs

1976 debut albums
Warner Records albums
Bootsy Collins albums